Federated Millers and Manufacturing Grocers Union was an Australian trade union. It represented workers in food processing and manufacturing industries.

Formation 

The Federated Millers and Manufacturing Grocers Union was formed through the amalgamation of two pre-existing unions, the Federated Millers and Mill Employees' Association of Australasia and the Manufacturing Grocers' Employees' Federation of Australia. Both unions represented relatively small memberships, and amalgamated as part of a period of union rationalisation encouraged by the ACTU.

Amalgamation

The new union did not last long as a separate entity, and in 1992 it amalgamated with the recently formed National Union of Workers. The new union was formed from several pre-existing organisations, the largest and most influential being the Federated Storemen and Packers Union.

References 

Defunct trade unions of Australia
Trade unions established in 1988
Trade unions disestablished in 1992
Food processing trade unions